Persoonia brevirhachis  is a species of flowering plant in the family Proteaceae and is endemic to the south-west of Western Australia. It is an erect, often spreading shrub with smooth, compact bark, mostly narrow spatula-shaped to lance-shaped leaves with the narrower end towards the base and yellow to greenish yellow flowers borne singly or in pairs in leaf axils.

Description

Taxonomy
Persoonia brevirhachis was first formally described in 1994 by Peter Weston in the journal Telopea from specimens collected by Donald Bruce Foreman south of Lake Grace in 1984.

Distribution and habitat
This geebung grows in heath between Lake Grace, Newdegate and Ravensthorpe in the south-west of Western Australia.

Conservation status
Persoonia brevirhachis is classified as "Priority Three" by the Government of Western Australia Department of Parks and Wildlife meaning that it is poorly known and known from only a few locations but is not under imminent threat.

References

Flora of Western Australia
brevirhachis
Plants described in 1994
Taxa named by Peter H. Weston